Sandefur is a surname. It is the surname of:
Dirk Sandefur (born 1961), associate justice of the Montana Supreme Court
Duke Sandefur, screenwriter for Ghost Town (1988 film) and Atlas Shrugged: Part II
Kelly Sandefur, producer of American television series Family Matters
Mike Sandefur, owner of the Texas Star Ferris wheel
Randy Sandefur, head coach of Long Beach State 49ers men's volleyball for 1970–1974
Rebecca Sandefur, American sociologist
Thomas Sandefur, fictional character in The Insider (film)
Wayne Sandefur, Purdue football player drafted by the Pittsburgh Steelers in 1936